Taube bas Leib Pan was a sixteenth-century Yiddish writer, who lived in the Prague ghetto at the time of Mordecai Meisel.

Pan was the daughter of Rabbi Moshe Leib Pitzker, and wife of Yakov Pan. Like many poets of this period, she published religious and ethical works in the current idiom of the Jews. Such publications were facilitated by the printing-press of Gersonides then running in Prague. Among other pieces, she published, probably in 1609, a poem of six pages under the title Ayn sheyn lid, nay gemakht, beloshn tkhine iz vorden ausgetrakht.

References

Attribution

Year of death unknown
Year of birth unknown
16th-century Jews
16th-century poets
16th-century Bohemian writers
16th-century Bohemian women
Bohemian Jews
European Ashkenazi Jews
Jewish women writers
Writers from Prague